Calumet Township is one of eleven townships in Lake County, Indiana. As of the 2010 census, its population was 104,258 and it contained 49,554 housing units.

Calumet Township was established in 1883.

Geography

Cities and Towns
Gary
Griffith

Parts of Griffith have been redistricted into North Township following a ballot measure in 2022.

Education
Calumet Township is served by three public school districts. Most of Incorporated Gary is served by the Gary Community School Corporation. Unincorporated areas of Gary in Calumet Township are served by the Lake Ridge Schools Corporation. The town of Griffith is served by Griffith Public Schools.

References

External links
 Official website

Townships in Lake County, Indiana
Townships in Indiana
populated places established in 1883
 1883 establishments in Indiana